HZL may refer to:
 Croatian Air Force Legion, active during the Second World War
 Hazleton Municipal Airport, in Pennsylvania, United States
 Hindustan Zinc Limited, an Indian mining company